Manuel Ruiz de Lopera y Ávalos (born 13 August 1944) is a Spanish businessman who was owner and chairman of football club Real Betis from 1992 to 2006. The team's stadium was named after him from 2000 to 2010, when it reverted to its previous name, Estadio Benito Villamarín.

References

1944 births
Spanish football chairmen and investors
Living people
Spanish businesspeople
Real Betis